The Red Hood is an alias used by multiple characters appearing in American comic books published by DC Comics. The identity was first used in the 1951 storyline "The Man Behind the Red Hood!", which provides the earliest origin story for the Joker. The storyline depicts an unnamed criminal wearing a red dome-shaped hood who, after a chance encounter with Batman, is disfigured by chemicals and becomes insane, giving birth to his future Joker persona.

Five decades later, the identity was used again in the 2005–2006 story arc, Batman: Under the Hood, in which Jason Todd, Batman's second crime-fighting partner who had been killed by the Joker, comes back to life as a violent vigilante, using his killer's former alias. Since his return, Jason operates as the Red Hood in the main DC Comics continuity. In The New 52, a 2011 reboot of the DC Comics universe, one storyline introduces a criminal organization called the Red Hood Gang, and retroactively establishes the Joker (prior to his transformation) as its former leader, and Jason as a former member.

Both the Joker and Jason Todd incarnations of the Red Hood, as well as the Red Hood Gang, have been adapted into several forms of media outside of comics, such as films, television series, and video games.

Fictional character biography

The Joker

The Red Hood first appeared in Detective Comics #168 (February 1951), in the story "The Man Behind the Red Hood!". In this original continuity, he became the future Joker; a flashback reveals that a criminal, who at that time called himself the Red Hood after the (seemingly) eyeless red dome-shaped hood worn by him, attempted to rob a playing card factory. While chased, he fell into a catch basin full of chemicals, which disfigured him, then escaped by swimming to safety (a breathing apparatus inside the hood preventing him from drowning). Driven insane by his change of appearance, he recreates himself as the Joker. A decade later, the Joker resumes the guise, while another criminal attempts to adopt the identity, too.

In Batman: The Killing Joke, writer Alan Moore added the new detail that the future Joker, at that time a cash-strapped, unsuccessful comedian, had been made to adopt the Red Hood guise by a gang of criminals so that he could play the patsy for them. This story presented a darker version of the origin and introduced the idea that the Joker acted as an unreliable narrator concerning his own past.

A retcon appears between the Batman #450–451 story line The Return of the Joker and the one-shot graphic novel Batman: The Man Who Laughs. In The Return of the Joker, the Joker resurfaces after his apparent death at the end of the Batman: A Death in the Family storyline. The Joker rummages through his belongings, finds the Red Hood costume and wears it for a robbery in order to regain his confidence and become the Joker again. Batman: The Man Who Laughs is a retelling of the Joker's first appearance, a few months after the Red Hood's plunge into the chemicals, thus tying the story into both Batman: Year One and Batman: The Killing Joke. Here, Batman is in possession of the Red Hood costume, presumably having discovered it on the banks where the Joker washed up after his swim in the chemical basin.

Jason Todd

Another version of Red Hood appears in the Daredevil storyline running through Batman comics, written by Judd Winick. Jason Todd, the former Robin killed by the Joker in Batman: A Death in the Family, is revealed to have been resurrected by Ra's al Ghul via the Lazarus Pit. But the pit changes him and his emotions and he becomes the new Red Hood. His debut culminates in a fateful confrontation with those he feels have wronged him. He beats the Joker with a crowbar (mirroring the way the Joker had tortured him before killing him with a bomb) and later kidnaps him. The new Red Hood assumes control over various gangs in Gotham City and starts a one-man war against Black Mask's criminal empire. He actively tries to cleanse the city of corruption, such as the illegal drug trade and gang violence, but in a violent, antiheroic way. He eventually comes to blows against Batman and other heroes, including Nightwing, the new Robin (Tim Drake), Onyx, and Green Arrow.

In the second story arc of Batman and Robin by Grant Morrison and Philip Tan, Jason retakes the Red Hood mantle. With the goal of making the very concept of Batman obsolete, he puts a lot of effort into public relations: he drastically alters his Red Hood costume to look more like a traditional superhero outfit, and recruits his own sidekick known as Scarlet. In their war on crime, Red Hood and Scarlet freely kill criminals, villains and anyone who gets in their way, even the police. After all of Red Hood's killings, he leaves behind a calling card which states "let the punishment fit the crime". He describes his vendetta against Dick Grayson as "the revenge of one crazy man in a mask on another crazy man in a mask". At the conclusion of this saga, Jason is last seen escaping from prison, having donned a new costume and sidekick free. Due to the Flashpoint event, his future was never explored.

After Barry Allen's involuntary tampering with the continuum, Red Hood is shown, along with Arsenal and Starfire, as one of the Outlaws, a close knit group of anti-heroes. Still not above killing, and still angry at the world, Jason has now reverted to the street clothes costume, forgoing his feud with Batman for stealthier, more cloak and dagger missions. Eventually, Jason and Batman reconcile and call a truce between them.

In an interview for the Infinite Crisis hardcover, Jeanine Schaefer states that Geoff Johns originally planned to reintroduce Red Hood as the Jason Todd of the Earth-Two universe, but such plans were discarded.

Red Hood Gang
In The New 52, a 2011 reboot of the DC Comics universe, a gang called the "Red Hood Gang" appears in issue #0 of Batman (vol. 2). A young Bruce Wayne, not yet Batman, has recently returned to Gotham to start his crime-fighting career. One of Bruce's early targets is the Red Hood Gang, which he manages to infiltrate. To Bruce's dismay, the leader of the Red Hood Gang knows his group has been infiltrated and manages to weed out a disguised Bruce. Though the Red Hood Gang attempts to kill him, Bruce manages to escape into the sewers after the police show up to break up a robbery. The Red Hood Gang eventually follows him into the sewer system, but a prototype motorcycle hidden in the tunnels allows Bruce to escape. The Red Hood Gang is later seen outside of Bruce's apartment, scoping it out for their next hit.

The Red Hood Gang subsequently reappeared in the first story arc of the "Zero Year" event, "Secret City", where, five months prior to the birth of Batman, Bruce gets involved with the Red Hood Gang to spoil their plans to sink a pickup truck full of men who refused to join their ranks. During this encounter, it is revealed that the Red Hood Gang's ranks have expanded. It turns out their leader has begun blackmailing innocent Gotham citizens into joining the group, threatening violence against them if they refuse to be his henchmen. They eventually steal an airship belonging to the Penguin and several weapons from Wayne Industries. Bruce discovers that the Red Hood Gang has been doing business with Bruce's uncle, Philip Kane, who has been selling them weapons after being forced to join the gang. When Bruce discovers this, he goes to tell Alfred, but a bomb from the Red Hood Gang to "welcome him back to the city" blows up the apartment.

The motivation of the Red Hood Gang comes to light, and it is revealed that they had been inspired by the impact that the murder of Bruce's parents had upon the city. The murders of the famous and beloved Doctor and Mrs. Wayne had made the residents of Gotham fearful, since if even the rich and powerful could be gunned down by a random criminal, no one was safe from crime. Embracing nihilism, the Red Hood Gang killed, robbed, and caused suffering in order to make the average citizen know their lives are worthless and they can and will be murdered at any given moment.

The culmination of the Red Hood Gang's campaign of terror is their plan to take over the Axis Chemical Plant and use its resources to create a flesh-eating bacteria. Batman lures the Gotham City Police Department to the plant. During the raid and the battle that ensues, Phillip Kane is mortally wounded by the leader, who accuses him of betrayal. Most of the gang is arrested, while Batman goes after the leader, who ultimately falls into a container of chemicals rather than be taken alive. A few days later, police discover the body of the leader of the gang, Liam Distal, stuffed into a barrel of lye. The lye has dissolved the better part of his remains, meaning there is no way to tell when he was killed. Bruce surmises that the Red Hood Gang leader he encountered was an impostor who killed Distal and took his place, but there is no way to confirm this, nor know when the impostor murdered Distal. Later, the remaining members of the gang are killed in an explosion caused by the Joker. After this, the Red Hood Gang seems to be defunct.

Alternate versions

DCAU comics
An animated version of the character appears at the end of The Batman Adventures #8. It was meant to be a subplot to be resolved later, but the cancellation of the ongoing series prevented that. Though the creative team (Dan Slott and Ty Templeton) behind the story are hoping for a chance to resolve it, they have yet to do so. It has been stated that this Red Hood is someone crucial to the DC animated universe.

Dan Slott mentioned that the background of the character would tie into a subplot concerning Lucius Fox, the Valestra mob (from Batman: Mask of the Phantasm) and the Powers Family (including an infant Derek Powers from Batman Beyond)

Though the comics storyline was never followed up, Dan Slott told fan website The Worlds Finest: "Had Batman Adventures continued, The Red Hood would have been revealed as Andrea Beaumont's mother, Victoria Beaumont, who also happened to be the real head of the Valestra mob. Years ago, she faked her death in an attempt to get her family away from the Valestra mob, and was disappointed to see her family eventually fall into their clutches. However, when she saw what happened to her husband, and what eventually became of her daughter, she felt it was time to not only get revenge on the Valestra mob, but take Gotham for herself. Inevitably, this would have led to a devastating confrontation between her, Batman, and Andrea Beaumont".

Batman '66
A version of the Red Hood appears in Batman '66 (which is based on the 1960s Batman TV series). This version of the Red Hood is Professor Anders Overbeck, a psychiatrist who was brainwashed by the Joker through his malfunctioning brain regulator machine.

In other media

Television
 A heroic, alternate reality version of the Joker / Red Hood appears in the Batman: The Brave and the Bold episode "Deep Cover for Batman!", voiced by Jeff Bennett.
 Two incarnations of the Red Hood Gang appear in Gotham.
 The first version appears in the episode "Red Hood", consisting of Gus Floyd (portrayed by Michael Goldsmith), failed baker Clyde Destro (portrayed by Jonny Coyne), Trope (portrayed by Peter Brensinger), Regan (portrayed by Kevin T. Collins), and Haskins (portrayed by Peter Albrink). Floyd conceives the idea of the Red Hood identity after making a red hooded mask for himself. Following a successful bank robbery, Floyd suggests whoever is wearing the red hood should lead the gang, Destro shoots him and takes the red mask and leadership of the gang for himself until Trope wounds Destro for the mask to impress his girlfriend. However, James Gordon and Harvey Bullock find Destro and force him to reveal his allies' names and their plans. Confronting the Red Hood Gang at the third bank they intended to hit, the Gotham City Police Department (GCPD) kill Trope, Regan, and Haskins, though a young boy picks up the fallen mask while they are not looking. According to the Gotham Chronicle website, Destro survived being shot and is in police custody.
 A second Red Hood Gang appears in the episode "Mad City: Anything for You", consisting of an unidentified leader (portrayed by Michael Stoyanov), several unnamed members, and Butch Gilzean as their secret benefactor. After they attack Mayor Oswald Cobblepot's press conference, Barbara Kean, Tabitha Galavan, and Edward Nygma discover Gilzean's connections to the Red Hood Gang. He kills the gang, but Nygma and Victor Zsasz eventually expose Gilzean.
 The Jason Todd incarnation of the Red Hood appears in the third season of Titans, portrayed by Curran Walters.

Film
 The Jason Todd and Joker incarnations of the Red Hood appear in Batman: Under the Red Hood, voiced by Jensen Ackles and John DiMaggio respectively.
 A statue of an unidentified incarnation of the Red Hood appears in Justice League: The Flashpoint Paradox.
 The Joker incarnation of the Red Hood appears in Batman: The Killing Joke, voiced by Mark Hamill.
 An unidentified incarnation of the Red Hood makes a non-speaking appearance in The Lego Batman Movie as one of many villains enlisted by the Joker to attack Gotham City.
 A Feudal Japan variation of Jason Todd / Red Hood appears in Batman Ninja, voiced by Akira Ishida in the Japanese version and by Yuri Lowenthal in the English dub.
 The Jason Todd incarnation of the Red Hood appears in Lego DC Batman: Family Matters, voiced by Jason Spisak.
 The Jason Todd incarnation of the Red Hood appears in Batman: Death in the Family, voiced by Vincent Martella.

Video games
The Jason Todd incarnation of the Red Hood appears as a playable character in Gotham Knights, voiced by Stephen Oyoung.

Batman: Arkham
 The Joker incarnation of the Red Hood appears in Batman: Arkham Origins.
 The Jason Todd incarnation of the Red Hood appears in Batman: Arkham Knight, voiced by Troy Baker.

Lego Batman
 The Jason Todd incarnation of the Red Hood appears as a playable character in the Nintendo 3DS and PlayStation Vita versions of Lego Batman 2: DC Super Heroes.
 The Jason Todd incarnation of the Red Hood appears as a playable character in Lego Batman 3: Beyond Gotham, voiced again by Troy Baker.
 The Jason Todd incarnation of the Red Hood appears as a playable character in Lego DC Super-Villains, voiced by Cameron Bowen.

Injustice
 The Joker incarnation of the Red Hood appears as a DLC skin for the Joker in Injustice: Gods Among Us.
 The Jason Todd incarnation of the Red Hood appears as a playable DLC character in Injustice 2, voiced again by Cameron Bowen.

Merchandise
 An action figure of the original version of Red Hood was released as part of the Justice League Unlimited toyline, included in a six figure set.
 In July 2014, DC Collectibles released a New 52 version of the Jason Todd incarnation of the Red Hood along with his teammates from the Outlaws (Arsenal and Starfire).
 A Red Hood figure was released in Mattel's DC Multiverse line, based on his appearance in Batman: Arkham Knight.
 In 2015, DC Collectibles released a GameStop exclusive Red Hood (Jason Todd) figure based on his appearance in the Red Hood DLC for Batman: Arkham Knight. In 2016, DC Collectibles released another figure of Jason Todd in series 3 of their Batman: Arkham Knight line, this time featuring a remould of the Arkham Knight figure's body, and a slight repaint of the Red Hood figure's head, depicting Todd's transition between his Arkham Knight and Red Hood personas.
 Funko has released a Red Hood Mystery Mini in their Batman: Arkham Series line.
 The Imaginext DC Super Friends line includes a Jason Todd Red Hood in the Series 2 blind bag set from 2016.

See also
 List of Batman family enemies

References

External links
Red Hood at DC Comics' official website

 
Batman characters code names
Characters created by Bill Finger
Comics characters introduced in 1951
Comics characters introduced in 2005
DC Comics supervillains
DC Comics male supervillains
Fictional gunfighters in comics